Piotr Bańka (born October 20, 1964 in Myszków) is a doctor, Polish politician and local official.

Biography 
He graduated from the Medical University of Silesia.

He is a member of Law and Justice political party in Poland. From 1998 to 2018 Bańka was a councilor of the Myszków County Council. From 2010 to 2014 he was in the executive board of the Myszków County. In 2018 local elections he successfully won the seat of a councilor in the Silesian Regional Assembly.

References 

1964 births
Living people